Boris Pavlovich Pozern (Russian: Борис Павлович Позерн; 7 July 1882 – 25 February 1939) was a Soviet politician, party official and member of the  Troika of the NKVD of the Soviet Union.

Pozerb was born in Nizhny Novgorod to a family of German origin. He became a member of the Russian  Social Democratic Labour Party in 1903. After the February Revolution, Pozern became the head of the Minsk Soviet.  

A member of the Russian Constituent Assembly of 1918. He was a member of the Central Committee elected by the 17th Congress of the All-Union Communist Party (Bolsheviks). During the Great Purge, he was arrested on 9 July 1938 and later executed by firing squad in Moscow. After the death of Joseph Stalin, he was rehabilitated in 1957.

Works
 Оппозиция на XV партконференции (Die Opposition auf der XV. Parteikonferenz)
 Moskau und Leningrad 1928: Как оппозиция обороняет СССР (Wie die Opposition die Sowjetunion "verteidigt")
 Leningrad 1925: Posern und andere: Коммунистическая партия и крестьянство (Die Kommunistische Partei und die Bauernschaft)
 Leningrad 1931: Новые задачи и новые условия работы инженерно-технических работников (Neue Aufgaben und Arbeitsbedingungen für das ingenieur-technische Personal)

Bibliography 
 Anatoli Rybakow: Jahre des Terrors. Roman. Deutsch von Juri Elperin. 440 Seiten. Deutscher Taschenbuch Verlag (dtv 11590), München 1992, 
 Przewodnik po historii Partii Komunistycznej i ZSRR (ros.)
 http://pomnipro.ru/memorypage6375/biography  (ros.)
 http://www.az-libr.ru/index.htm?Persons&FE7/c188733b/index (ros.)

External links
 WorldCat Eintrag
 Eintrag bei hrono.ru 
 Eintrag aus der Großen Sowjetischen Enzyklopädie Aufl. 1959 bei dic.academic.ru 
 Eintrag bei az-libr.ru 
 Eintrag in der Russisch-Europäischen Enzyklopädie 

1882 births
1939 deaths
Bolsheviks
Executed politicians
Russian Constituent Assembly members
Soviet rehabilitations
Great Purge victims from Russia
Soviet politicians
Soviet military personnel
People executed by firing squad
People of the Russian Revolution
People of the Russian Civil War
Politicians from Nizhny Novgorod
Communist Party of the Soviet Union members
People executed by the Soviet Union
Residents of the Benois House